The Grammy Award for Best Engineered Recording, Classical has been awarded since  1959.  The award had several minor name changes:

In 1959 the award was known as Best Engineered Record (Classical)
From 1960 to 1962 it was awarded as Best Engineering Contribution - Classical Recording
From 1963 to 1964 it was awarded as Best Engineered Recording - Classical
In 1965 it was awarded as Best Engineered Recording
From 1966 to 1994 it returned to the title Best Engineered Recording, Classical
From 1966 to 1994 it was awarded as Best Classical Engineered Recording
Since 1992 it has been awarded as Best Engineered Album, Classical

This award is presented alongside the Grammy Award for Best Engineered Album, Non-Classical.  From 1960 to 1965 a further award was presented for Best Engineered Recording - Special or Novel Effects.

Years reflect the year in which the Grammy Awards were presented, for works released in the previous year.

The award is presented to engineers (and, if applicable, mastering engineers), not to artists, orchestras, conductors or other performers on the winning works, except if the engineer is also a performer.

Winners and nominees

Notes

References

Grammy Awards for classical music
Audio engineering
Album awards